Carl-Olivier "C. O." Primé (born October 29, 1989) is a Canadian football fullback. He was drafted by the Hamilton Tiger-Cats in the third round of the 2013 CFL Draft. He played college football at Wagner College and attended Kent School in Kent, Connecticut. Primé has also been a member of the Indianapolis Colts of the National Football League (NFL).

College career
Primé played for the Wagner Seahawks from 2009 to 2012. He recorded career totals of 278 defensive tackles, 3.5 quarterback sacks, four forced fumbles and fumble recoveries, and an interception.

Professional career

Indianapolis Colts
Primé signed with the Indianapolis Colts of the NFL on April 30, 2013 after going undrafted in the 2013 NFL Draft. He was released by the Colts on August 25, 2013.

Hamilton Tiger-Cats
Primé was drafted by the Hamilton Tiger-Cats of the CFL with the 19th pick in the 2013 CFL Draft. He signed with the team on September 9, 2013. He scored his first career touchdown on a 49-yard fumble return against the Winnipeg Blue Bombers on November 2, 2013. Primé played in all three of the Tiger-Cats playoff games in 2013, including the 101st Grey Cup loss to the Saskatchewan Roughriders.

References

External links
Just Sports Stats
Hamilton Tiger-Cats bio
NFL Draft Scout
Indianapolis Colts bio

Living people
1989 births
Players of Canadian football from Quebec
American football fullbacks
Canadian football fullbacks
Black Canadian players of American football
Kent School alumni
Wagner Seahawks football players
Hamilton Tiger-Cats players
Sportspeople from Laval, Quebec